Guerou is a department of Assaba Region in Mauritania.

List of municipalities in the department 
The Guerou department is made up of following municipalities:

 El Ghayra
 Guerou
 Kamour
 Oueid Jrid

In 2000, the entire population of the Guerou Department has a total of 31 480 inhabitants  (14 085 men and 17 395 women).

References 

Departments of Mauritania